Lukáš Lukčo (born 27 July 2001) is a professional Slovak footballer who currently plays for Fortuna Liga club Zemplín Michalovce as a midfielder.

Club career

MFK Zemplín Michalovce
Lukčo made his Fortuna Liga debut for Zemplín Michalovce against Žilina on 11 July 2020.

References

External links
 
 Futbalnet profile

2001 births
Living people
People from Vranov nad Topľou
Sportspeople from the Prešov Region
Slovak footballers
Association football midfielders
MFK Zemplín Michalovce players
Slovak Super Liga players